Niobium(V) oxalate is the hydrogen oxalate salt of niobium(V). The neutral salt has not been prepared.

Complexes
Niobium(V) can form complexes with hydroxy acids, as well as oxalic acid. The salt formed is more complex than tartaric acid for niobium (as opposed to tantalum). NH4[NbO(C2O4)2(H2O)2]·3H2O starts to lose water at 125°C, and at 630°C, it fully decomposes, forming a compound known as niobium pentoxide; Heating this complex and sodium citrate at 650°C can form sodium niobate (NaNbO3).

Rb3[NbO(C2O4)3]·2H2O is a colourless crystal, which includes the [NbO(C2O4)3]3- anion. Sr3[NbO(C2O4)3]2·8H2O is a compound containing the same anion, forming the anhydrous at 200°C, starting to decompose at 260°C, and at 875°C it decomposes to SrCO3 and SrNb2O6.

References

niobium compounds
oxalates